The Nellis Solar Power Plant is a 14-megawatt (MW) photovoltaic power station located within Nellis Air Force Base in Clark County, Nevada, northeast of Las Vegas. The power plant was inaugurated in a ceremony on December 17, 2007, with Nevada Governor Jim Gibbons activating its full operation. On average, it has since generated 32 gigawatt-hours of electricity annually and supplied more than 25% of the power used at the base.

Occupying  of land leased from the Air Force at the northeastern corner of the base, this ground-mounted solar system employs an advanced sun tracking system, designed and deployed by SunPower. The system contains approximately 70,000 solar panels, and the peak power generation capacity of the plant is approximately 13 MWAC. This means the ratio of average to peak output, or capacity factor, of this plant is around 22%.

The energy generated will support more than 12,000 military and civilians at Nellis who are responsible for Air Force advanced combat training, tactics development and operational testing. Construction began on April 23, 2007, and operation of the first 5 MW began on October 12, 2007.

Economics 
Under the terms of the Power Purchase Agreement, MMA Renewable Ventures, who own the panels, is leasing the land at no cost and Nellis is agreeing to buy the power for 20 years at about 2.2 cents/kW·h, instead of the 9 cents they are paying to Nevada Power, saving the Air Force $1 million each year. None of the $100 million cost came from the Air Force, but instead from subsidizing taxpayers and Nevada Power customers who are paying for the renewable portfolio standard credits.

The partners were able to build the plant, recover costs and produce electricity at a savings, because of the fairly complex financing structure arranged among MMA, its investors, Nevada Power, and Nellis — in addition to multimillion-dollar government incentives.

The plant was expected to produce 30 GWh per year but actually produced about 32 GWh the first year, 8% more than expected, saving the Air Force $1.2 million in the first year of operation.

There is no provision for operation during a power failure, when the base reverts to generator power. This would require limiting the output to less than or equal to what the generators can provide. Otherwise a cloud could pass over and cause the sudden drop in output to overload the generators, causing them to trip off. If a pumped-hydro facility was added in the nearby hills, that would allow the base to operate during power failures under solar power, although batteries would also be needed to allow time for the hydro-electric plant to adjust to the load requirements.

Design 
Nellis consists of 5,821 tilted axis, T20 single axis trackers made by Sunpower, and uses 72,416 solar panels, each 200 watts, and 54 Xantrex (Schneider Electric) GT 250 inverters, each rated 250 kW. The maximum output is therefore inverter limited to 13.5 megawatts (AC). At full output, the inverters are 96% efficient. Approximately 10% of the panels are mounted on north–south-oriented horizontal single-axis trackers. About one-third of the solar panels were made by Suntech Power, the lead supplier.

Renewable portfolio standard 

In 1999, Nevada passed a renewable portfolio standard (RPS) as part of their 1997 Electric Restructuring Legislation (AB 366). It required any electric providers in the state to acquire actual renewable electric generation or purchase renewable energy credits so that each utility had 1 percent of total consumption in renewables. However, on June 8, 2001, Nevada Governor Kenny Guinn signed SB 372, at the time the country's most aggressive renewable portfolio standard. The law requires that 15 percent of all electricity generated in Nevada be derived from new renewables by the year 2013.

The 2001, revision to the RPS keeps in place Nevada's commitment to expand solar energy resources by requiring that at least 5 percent of the renewable energy projects must generate electricity from solar energy.

In June 2005, the Nevada legislature passed a bill during a special legislative session that modified the Nevada RPS (Assembly Bill 03). The bill extends the deadline and raised the requirements of the RPS to 20 percent of sales by 2015.

Expansion 
An extension of the plant called Nellis Solar PV II, which will generate another 15 megawatts of power, began construction on March 24, 2015, and was completed in February 2016.

Presidential visit 

President Barack Obama visited the facility and addressed an audience of more than 450 people on May 27, 2009.

Production

See also 

DeSoto Next Generation Solar Energy Center
List of photovoltaic power stations
Renewable energy in the United States
Renewable portfolio standard
Solar power
Solar power in the United States
Solar power in Nevada

References

External links

Hi-res image
Largest Solar-Power Generation Station in U.S. to be at Nellis
Real time monitor

Solar power in the Mojave Desert
Photovoltaic power stations in the United States
Buildings and structures in Clark County, Nevada
Solar power stations in Nevada
Energy infrastructure completed in 2007